Warped by Success is the sixth studio album by English musical group China Crisis. It was released on CD, LP and Cassette in 1994.

Track listing
"Hands On the Wheel" (Eddie Lundon) - 4:10
"Always" (Gary Daly) - 5:06
"Everyday the Same" (Daly) - 5:49
"Without the Love" (Daly, Lundon) - 4:25
"Thank You" (Lundon) - 3:37
"Hard to be Around" (Daly) - 4:06
"One Wish Too Many" (Daly, Lundon) - 2:06
"Wishing Time" (Lundon) - 3:31
"Good Again" (Daly) - 4:11
"Real Tears" (Daly) - 4:36
"Does It Pay" (Daly) - 4:04
"The Way We Are Made" (Daly, Lundon) - 3:30

Personnel
China Crisis
Gary Daly - vocals
Eddie Lundon - guitar, vocals

Additional personnel
Gary "Gazza" Johnson - original bass line and bass guitar on "Without the Love"
Kevin Wilkinson - sampled verse kit on "Always"
Tracy Ackerman - backing vocals
Jenny Evans - backing vocals
Chris "Snake" Davis - saxophone, flute
John Thirkell - trumpet, flugelhorn
Kofi Kari Kari - percussion
Simon Callow - electric piano on "Hands On the Wheel"
Martin Green - saxophone, flute
Damon Reece - sampled chorus kit on "Good Again"

References

1994 albums
China Crisis albums